Spero is a surname. Notable people with the surname include:

Anthony Spero (1929-2008), American criminal
David Spero (born 1951), American DJ and music manager
Deborah Spero, American law enforcement official
Donald Spero (born 1939), American rower and venture capitalist
Emji Spero, American queer performance artist
Ernest Spero (1894-1960), British politician
George Spero (footballer) (born 1941), Australian rules footballer
Greg Spero (born 1985), American pianist and composer
Joan E. Spero (born 1944), American diplomat
Nancy Spero (1926–2009), American visual artist
Shubert Spero (born 1923), American rabbi
Stanislas Spero Adotevi (born 1934), Beninese politician
Wendy Spero, American comedian